Richmond High School is a high school located in the Melbourne, Australia suburb of Richmond. Its predecessor, Richmond Secondary College, was the centre of a public protest and occupation of the site after it was listed for closure by the Liberal Kennett Government in 1993.

1967-1992
The school commenced in 1967 in portable classrooms at the back of Brighton Street Primary School, before moving in 1970 to purpose-built premises on the banks of the Yarra River near Bridge Road. The school's name was changed to Richmond Secondary College, and in 1992 it was listed for closure by the Kennett Government. Community protests against the closure were endorsed by the Victorian Trades Hall Council and lasted 360 days before protesters were evicted by the Victoria Police Force Response Unit. The methods of crowd dispersal used by police on Monday 13 December 1993, which included "pressure holds" and a baton charge, were the subject of a parliamentary inquiry, with 30 demonstrators receiving $300,000 in a settlement from the Bracks Government in 2000. In 1994, the buildings became the campus of the new Melbourne Girls College.

2018-present day
In 2014 the Labor Party pledged to build a new Richmond High School if elected. In 2016 the Labor Government announced plans to build the school. The new school is located in Gleadell Street (Multi-purpose Campus, opened in 2018) and Griffiths Street (Vertical Campus, opened in 2019).

References

External links
 Richmond High School
 www.richmondhighschool.info

Public high schools in Melbourne
Educational institutions established in 1967
Defunct schools in Victoria (Australia)
1967 establishments in Australia
Buildings and structures in the City of Yarra